The Joke Machine was the Krankies' second solo attempt at a children's television show since Crackerjack.

References 

1985 British television series debuts
1986 British television series endings
ITV children's television shows
1980s British children's television series